Arieh Smith, better known as Xiaomanyc or simply Xiaoma, (transl. "Little Pony") is an American YouTuber and polyglot, best known for his videos consisting of him speaking various languages with people from different cultures. The New York Times credited him as one of the most popular polyglot YouTube channels. Videos of his have received coverage in news publications such as The Independent, The Indian Express and The Daily Dot.

Life and career
Arieh Smith is a native of New York and grew up only knowing English. After graduating from high school, Smith took a basic Mandarin Chinese class during the summer before attending the University of Chicago. At his time in university, Smith attained a scholarship to study abroad in Beijing, China for one year, where he delved deeper into the Mandarin language. Smith eventually learned other languages using his own method of memorizing translated versions of varying phrases.

Smith gained popularity on YouTube for his ability to speak Mandarin Chinese at a near-native level, as well as French, Spanish, Yiddish, Yoruba, Telugu, Navajo, and various Chinese dialects at a basic conversational level.
Many of his videos showcase Smith partaking in diverse ethnic cultures alongside recording people's reactions to his fluency in non-English languages. He has also collaborated with fellow polyglot YouTuber Frankie Light in a video where the pair travel around New York City while speaking Mandarin, which garnered 4.2 million views.

References

American YouTubers
Multilingualism
American Jews